Pothos Argyros or Argyrus can refer to:

 Pothos Argyros (Domestic of the Schools) (fl. 900s–922), Byzantine general and Domestic of the Schools
 Pothos Argyros (11th century) (fl. 1030s), Byzantine general and catepan of Italy